Touques can refer to:

 Touques, Calvados, a commune of the Calvados département, in northern France
 Touques (river), a small coastal river in Normandy, France,
 the plural form of touque, a regional variation of tuque/toque (a knitted hat, usually made of wool).

See also

 

 Toque (disambiguation)
 Tuque (disambiguation)